Taft is a town in Muskogee County, Oklahoma, United States. The population was 250 at the 2010 census, a decline of 28.4 percent from the figure of 349 recorded in 2000. The town began as an all-black town on land allotted to Creek Freedmen. It is named for President William Howard Taft.

History
This community began as an all-black town on land allotted to freedmen of the Creek Nation. It was originally named Twine, for William H. Twine, and had a post office by 1902. Twine moved to Muskogee, and the citizens voted to rename the town as Taft, for President William Howard Taft, who was then Secretary of War in the Theodore Roosevelt administration.

Educational and correctional facilities have long been the town's leading employers. These have included: W. T. Vernon School (1908), the Industrial Institute for the Deaf, Blind, and Orphans of the Colored Race (1909), Moton High School, and the State Training School for Negro Girls.

Taft also contains two penitentiaries: Dr. Eddie Warrior Correctional Center, for women, and Jess Dunn Correctional Center, for men.

In April, 1973, Lelia Foley was elected as Mayor of Taft, becoming one of the African-American women elected as mayor in the United States.

A mass shooting incident occurred at an outdoor Memorial Day event in Taft, shortly after midnight on May 29, 2022. Seven people were reported to be injured, with a 39-year-old woman killed. Media accounts say that this incident was one of at least 12 mass shooting events that occurred over the Memorial Day weekend across the United States. 26-year-old Skyler Buckner was charged in connection with the shooting.

Geography
Taft is located at  (35.762595, -95.546046).

Demographics

As of the census of 2000, there were 349 people, 136 households, and 87 families residing in the town. There were 155 housing units at an average density of 101.2 per square mile (39.1/km2). The racial makeup of the town was 85.39% African American, 3.72% White, 1.15% Native American, 0.29% from other races, and 9.46% from two or more races. Hispanic or Latino of any race were 0.57% of the population.

There were 136 households, out of which 33.1% had children under the age of 18 living with them, 36.0% were married couples living together, 23.5% had a female householder with no husband present, and 35.3% were non-families. 31.6% of all households were made up of individuals, and 12.5% had someone living alone who was 65 years of age or older. The average household size was 2.57 and the average family size was 3.30.

In the town, the population was spread out, with 35.0% under the age of 18, 7.2% from 18 to 24, 20.1% from 25 to 44, 19.8% from 45 to 64, and 18.1% who were 65 years of age or older. The median age was 36 years. For every 100 females, there were 75.4 males. For every 100 females age 18 and over, there were 65.7 males.

The median income for a household in the town was $18,889, and the median income for a family was $26,500. Males had a median income of $20,417 versus $17,813 for females. The per capita income for the town was $11,278. About 23.0% of families and 33.7% of the population were below the poverty line, including 44.4% of those under age 18 and 18.8% of those age 65 or over.

See also
 Boley, Brooksville, Clearview, Grayson, Langston, Lima, Redbird, Rentiesville, Summit, Tatums, Tullahassee, and Vernon, other "All-Black" settlements that were part of the Land Run of 1889.

References

Towns in Muskogee County, Oklahoma
Towns in Oklahoma
Populated places in Oklahoma established by African Americans
Pre-statehood history of Oklahoma